Luc Lafortune (born September 1958) is a Canadian lighting designer for the entertainment industry as well as one of the original designers of the Cirque du Soleil.

Career

Lafortune studied at Dawson College, and then McGill University, where he obtained a bachelor's degree in Arts. He later obtained a bachelor's degree in Fine Arts from Concordia University.

Upon graduation, he went to work for Cirque du Soleil, embarking on their first tour, Le Grand Tour, a 13-week stint across rural Quebec, organized in conjunction with the celebrations marking the 450th anniversary of the discovery of Canada by French explorer, Jacques Cartier.  Since then, Lafortune has designed numerous Cirque du Soleil shows, including "Le Cirque Réinventé (We Reinvent the Circus), Fascination, Nouvelle Expérience, Saltimbanco, Mystère, Alegría, Quidam, O, La Nouba, Dralion, Varekai (co-designer), Zumanity and Kà.

In 2010, Lafortune completed the lighting design for the Franco Dragone production The House of Dancing Water at the City of Dreams, in Macau. In 2011, he designed the lighting for Turkmenistan's Twentieth Anniversary of Independence Gala, in collaboration with Filmmaster Events in Ashgabat.

 Awards

2013 Recipient of a Les Etoiles du Siel Award
2012 ThEA Themed Entertainment Association Award in the "Live Show" Category, for The House of Dancing Water, Macau
2005 USITT United States Institute of Theatre Technology Distinguished Lighting Designer Award
1999 THEA Themed Entertainment Association Award in the "Live Show" Category, for O1998 EDDY Entertainment Design Award, Show of the Year, for O1997 Lighting Dimensions International Light Show of the Year Award, for Martin's Atomic Lounge1994 Lighting Dimensions International Lighting Designer of the Year
1992 Drama-Logue Critics Award in Lighting, for Saltimbanco''

In 2004, he registered at #34 on Live Design's list of the entertainment's industry's most powerful people.

References

External links

 Official site

1958 births
Cirque du Soleil
Concordia University alumni
Dawson College alumni
French Quebecers
Lighting designers
Living people
People from Montreal